Bob Foster may refer to:

 Bob Foster (American football) (1886–1947), American football player
 Bob Foster (American football, born 1941), American football coach
 Bob Foster (boxer) (1938–2015), American boxer
 Bob Foster (footballer) (born 1911), English football goalkeeper
 Bob Foster (motorcyclist) (1911–1982), British motorcycle racer
 Bob Foster (politician) (born 1947), former mayor of Long Beach, California

See also
 Robert Foster (disambiguation)